The 1959 Manitoba general election was held on May 14, 1959 to elect 57 members to the Legislative Assembly of Manitoba, Canada. It resulted in a majority victory for the incumbent Progressive Conservatives under the leadership of Premier Dufferin Roblin. It was the first time since the 1914 election that the Tories won an outright majority in the province.

Roblin's Tories won 36 seats against 11 for the Liberal-Progressives, led by former Premier Douglas Campbell, and 10 for the social democratic Co-operative Commonwealth Federation led by Lloyd Stinson. The Tories took 25 percent more votes than it had received in the previous election just one year beforenbut took 40 percent more seats than it had won in 1958. They had won 117,822 votes in 1958, compared to 147,000 in 1959.

The Manitoba Social Credit Party, which won 2 seats in the 1958 election, did not contest any seats during the election and regained a foothold in the legislature only during a subsequent by-election. The communist Labor-Progressive Party contested three ridings but did not win any.

The election is the last one to be fought by candidates with the "Liberal-Progressive," "Co-operative Commonwealth," or "Labor-Progressive" labels in Manitoba. The Liberal-Progressives dropped the latter half in 1961 and ran all subsequent elections as "Liberals." Similarly, the Labor-Progressive candidates returned to the "Communist" label. The CCF changed its name following the national party's re-incorporation into the New Democratic Party and ran all future elections as Manitoba New Democrats.

Detailed Results

Summary

Northern Manitoba

|-
| style="background:whitesmoke;"|Churchill
||
|John Ingebrigtson1,587
|
|Kenneth D. Wray954
|
|
|
|
||
|E.J. Williams
|-
| style="background:whitesmoke;"|Flin Flon
||
|Charles Witney1,810
|
|Francis Jobin1,728
|
|Frederick S. Pope923
|
|
||
|Francis Jobin
|-
| style="background:whitesmoke;"|Rupertsland
||
|Joseph Jeannotte2,268
|
|Harry Boulette587
|
|Alfred J. Cook393
|
|
||
|Joseph Jeannotte
|-
| style="background:whitesmoke;"|The Pas
||
|John Carroll2,345
|
|Marvin Hill1,027
|
|Peter Schewchuk779
|
|
||
|John Carroll
|}

Southern Manitoba

|-
| style="background:whitesmoke;"|Arthur
||
|John Cobb2,513
|
|John McRae1,932
|
|
|
|William G. Powne (Ind.)556
||
|John Cobb
|-
| style="background:whitesmoke;"|Birtle-Russell
||
|Robert Smellie2,239
|
|Rodney Clement2,015
|
|Michael Sotas947
|
|
||
|Rodney Clement
|-
| style="background:whitesmoke;"|Brandon
||
|Reginald Lissaman5,452
|
|Gordon A. Phillips2,159
|
|Hans Fries1,415
|
|
||
|Reginald Lissaman
|-
| style="background:whitesmoke;"|Brokenhead
|
|Gordon B. Burnett1,409
|
|Arthur Trapp1,083
||
|Ed Schreyer2,107
|
|
||
|Ed Schreyer
|-
| style="background:whitesmoke;"|Carillon
|
|Peter J. Thiessen1,791
||
|Edmond Prefontaine2,397
|
|
|
|
||
|Edmond Prefontaine
|-
| style="background:whitesmoke;"|Cypress
||
|Marcel Boulic2,951
|
|John Leslie Sundell1,781
|
|
|
|
||
|Marcel Boulic
|-
| style="background:whitesmoke;"|Dauphin
||
|Stewart McLean2,951
|
|Emma Hildegard Ringstrom967
|
|A. Clifford Matthews1,233
|
|
||
|Stewart McLean
|-
| style="background:whitesmoke;"|Dufferin
||
|William Homer Hamilton2,077
|
|Walter McDonald1,923
|
|Chester Ernest Johnson167
|
|
||
|Walter McDonald
|-
| style="background:whitesmoke;"|Emerson
|
|Ben Comeaux2,190
||
|John Tanchak2,752
|
|
|
|
||
|John Tanchak
|-
| style="background:whitesmoke;"|Ethelbert Plains
|
|Isadore Syrnyk1,001
||
|Michael Hryhorczuk1,856
|
|Peter Burtniak1,590
|
|
||
|Michael Hryhorczuk
|-
| style="background:whitesmoke;"|Fisher
|
|Roy Ellison1,361
|
|W.J. Griffin, Jr.1,028
||
|Peter Wagner1,777
|
|
||
|Peter Wagner
|-
| style="background:whitesmoke;"|Gimli
||
|George Johnson2,570
|
|Alex Hawrysh1,007
|
|Zado Zator932
|
|
||
|George Johnson
|-
| style="background:whitesmoke;"|Gladstone
|
|Earl Murray2,318
||
|Nelson Shoemaker2,469
|
|Della Yuel415
|
|
||
|Nelson Shoemaker
|-
| style="background:whitesmoke;"|Hamiota
||
|Barry Strickland2,377
|
|James Chester Scott2,136
|
|Arthur Nicholson440
|
|
||
|Barry Strickland
|-
| style="background:whitesmoke;"|Lac du Bonnet
||
|Oscar Bjornson1,357
|
|John Ateah1,272
|
|Donald H. MacLean1,018
|
|Stanley Copp (Ind.)346
||
|Arthur Trapp
|-
| style="background:whitesmoke;"|Lakeside
|
|John Frederick Bate1,774
||
|Douglas Campbell1,896
|
|Allen Werbiski278
|
|
||
|Douglas Campbell
|-
| style="background:whitesmoke;"|La Verendrye
|
|Edmund Guertin1,581
||
|Stan Roberts1,799
|
|
|
|
||
|Stan Roberts
|-
| style="background:whitesmoke;"|Minnedosa
||
|Walter Weir2,386
|
|Charles L. Shuttleworth2,029
|
|J.M. Lee1,090
|
|
||
|Charles L. Shuttleworth
|-
| style="background:whitesmoke;"|Morris
||
|Harry Shewman1,905
|
|Bruce MacKenzie1,298
|
|
|
|
||
|Harry Shewman
|-
| style="background:whitesmoke;"|Pembina
||
|Maurice Ridley3,077
|
|Lynwood Graham1,199
|
|
|
|
||
|Maurice Ridley
|-
| style="background:whitesmoke;"|Portage la Prairie
||
|John Christianson2,300
|
|Charles Greenlay1,827
|
|Fred Allan Tufford416
|
|
||
|Charles Greenlay
|-
| style="background:whitesmoke;"|Rhineland
|
|Leo Recksiedler1,462
||
|Wallace C. Miller1,648
|
|
|
|
||
|Wallace C. Miller
|-
| style="background:whitesmoke;"|Roblin
||
|Keith Alexander1,946
|
|Ray Mitchell1,334
|
|Joseph Perchaluk1,569
|
|
||
|Keith Alexander
|-
| style="background:whitesmoke;"|Rock Lake
||
|Abram Harrison2,545
|
|Walter Clark1,843
|
|Cyril Hamwee632
|
|
||
|Abram Harrison
|-
| style="background:whitesmoke;"|Rockwood-Iberville
||
|George Hutton2,269
|
|Robert Bend2,143
|
|Samuel Cranston444
|
|
||
|Robert Bend
|-
| style="background:whitesmoke;"|St. George
|
|Ivan George Casselman1,371
||
|Elman Guttormson2,279
|
|Nellie Baker255
|
|
||
|Elman Guttormson
|-
| style="background:whitesmoke;"|Ste. Rose
|
|Albert Fletcher1,576
||
|Gildas Molgat2,390
|
|Leon W. Hoefer353
|
|
||
|Gildas Molgat
|-
| style="background:whitesmoke;"|Selkirk
|
|Edward Foster1,732
||
|Thomas P. Hillhouse1,814
|
|Scottie Bryce872
|
|
||
|Thomas P. Hillhouse
|-
| style="background:whitesmoke;"|Souris-Lansdowne
||
|Malcolm McKellar2,688
|
|George Adrian Griffith1,448
|
|
|
|
||
|Malcolm McKellar
|-
| style="background:whitesmoke;"|Springfield
||
|Fred Klym1,878
|
|William Lucko1,507
|
|Richard Loeb772
|
|
||
|William Lucko
|-
| style="background:whitesmoke;"|Swan River
||
|Albert H.C. Corbett2,292
|
|Arvid Burst786
|
|Hilliard Farriss1,431
|
|
||
|Albert H.C. Corbett
|-
| style="background:whitesmoke;"|Turtle Mountain
||
|Errick Willis3,247
|
|Walter Christianson1,187
|
|
|
|
||
|Errick Willis
|-
| style="background:whitesmoke;"|Virden
||
|John Thompson3,097
|
|John Wesley Clarke1,337
|
|
|
|
||
|John Thompson
|-
|}

Winnipeg

|-
| style="background:whitesmoke;"|Assiniboia
||
|George Johnson3,157
|
|Jack Brownrigg1,388
|
|Donovan Swailes2,940
|
|George R.A. Brown (Ind.)269
||
|Donovan Swailes
|-
| style="background:whitesmoke;"|Burrows
|
|Andrew Zaharychuk1,286
|
|Joseph R. Hnidan1,155
||
|John Hawryluk2,235
|
|William Cecil Ross (LPP)675
||
|John Hawryluk
|-
| style="background:whitesmoke;"|Elmwood
|
|Henry Emerson Snyder2,560
|
|Alex Turk1,488
||
|Steve Peters2,782
|
|
||
|Steve Peters
|-
| style="background:whitesmoke;"|Fort Garry
||
|Sterling Lyon4,842
|
|Stanley Farwell2,035
|
|Nena Woodward1,373
|
|
||
|Sterling Lyon
|-
| style="background:whitesmoke;"|Fort Rouge
||
|Gurney Evans4,352
|
|Jerome Marrin1,947
|
|Robert C. Murdoch1,425
|
|
||
|Gurney Evans
|-
| style="background:whitesmoke;"|Inkster
|
|Mary A. Wawrykow2,106
|
|John A. Kolt981
||
|Morris Gray3,635
|
|L.W. Kaminski (LPP)468
||
|Morris Gray
|-
| style="background:whitesmoke;"|Kildonan
|
|John Ernest Willis3,511
|
|Cornelius Huebert1,972
||
|A.J. Reid3,659
|
|
||
|A.J. Reid
|-
| style="background:whitesmoke;"|Logan
|
|Albert Edward Bennett1,921
|
|John Kozoriz873
||
|Lemuel Harris2,098
|
|
||
|Stephen Juba
|-
| style="background:whitesmoke;"|Osborne
||
|Obie Baizley3,808
|
|David Bowman1,166
|
|Lloyd Stinson3,482
|
|
||
|Lloyd Stinson
|-
| style="background:whitesmoke;"|Radisson
|
|Harold Huppe2,998
|
|Nick Slotek2,029
||
|Russell Paulley4,085
|
|
||
|Russell Paulley
|-
| style="background:whitesmoke;"|River Heights
||
|W.B. Scarth4,936
|
|Keith Routley3,060
|
|Magnus Eliason478
|
|
||
|W.B. Scarth
|-
| style="background:whitesmoke;"|St. Boniface
|
|Harry De Leeuw2,992
||
|Laurent Desjardins3,772
|
|Benjamin Cyr1,309
|
|
||
|Roger Teillet
|-
| style="background:whitesmoke;"|St. James
||
|Douglas Stanes3,616
|
|David Graham1,541
|
|Al Mackling2,348
|
|
||
|Douglas Stanes
|-
| style="background:whitesmoke;"|St. Johns
|
|Dan Zaharia2,010
|
|Abe Yanofsky854
||
|David Orlikow2,261
|
|Jacob Penner (LPP)588
||
|David Orkilow
|-
| style="background:whitesmoke;"|St. Matthews
||
|William Martin3,635
|
|Paul Goodman1,900
|
|Gordon Fines2,090
|
|
||
|William Martin
|-
| style="background:whitesmoke;"|St. Vital
||
|Fred Groves4,599
|
|George R. D. Goulet1,946
|
|Joseph Trafer353
|
|
||
|Fred Groves
|-
| style="background:whitesmoke;"|Seven Oaks
|
|Charles Nye1,973
|
|Calvin Scarfe1,343
||
|Arthur E. Wright3,889
|
|
||
|Arthur E. Wright
|-
| style="background:whitesmoke;"|Wellington
||
|Richard Seaborn3,082
|
|William Norrie1,624
|
|James McIsaac2,854
|
|
||
|Richard Seaborn
|-
| style="background:whitesmoke;"|Winnipeg Centre
||
|James Cowan3,712
|
|Gurzon Harvey1,462
|
|Fred Paulley1,474
|
|
||
|James Cowan
|-
| style="background:whitesmoke;"|Wolseley
||
|Dufferin Roblin4,351
|
|Francis C. Muldoon1,707
|
|Peter Griffin1,131
|
|
||
|Dufferin Roblin
|-
|}

By-elections 1958 to 1962

|- style="background-color:white"
! style="text-align:right;" colspan=3 |Total valid votes 
! style="text-align:right;" |3,995
! style="text-align:right;" colspan=2 |100

|- style="background-color:white"
! style="text-align:right;" colspan=3 |Total valid votes 
! style="text-align:right;" |4,032
! style="text-align:right;" colspan=2 |100

|- style="background-color:white"
! style="text-align:right;" colspan=3 |Total valid votes 
! style="text-align:right;" |3,584
! style="text-align:right;" colspan=2 |100

|- style="background-color:white"
! style="text-align:right;" colspan=3 |Total valid votes 
! style="text-align:right;" |4,654
! style="text-align:right;" colspan=2|100

|- style="background-color:white"
! style="text-align:right;" colspan=3 |Total valid votes 
! style="text-align:right;" |4,934
! style="text-align:right;" colspan=2 |100

See also
 List of Manitoba political parties

References

1959 elections in Canada
1959
1959 in Manitoba
May 1959 events in North America